This article contains information about the literary events and publications of 1857.

Events
January 5 – Wilkie Collins' drama The Frozen Deep is first performed in a private amateur performance featuring Charles Dickens, staged by him at his London home, Tavistock House.
January 10 – Jules Verne marries Honorine de Viane Morel.

February 7 – Gustave Flaubert's pioneering realist novel Madame Bovary is acquitted (but censured) on charges of offending morals and religion from its 1856 expurgated serialization. It is published complete in book form in April by Michel Lévy Frères in Paris.
May 2 – The British Museum Reading Room opens in London.
May 5 – American publisher Moses Phillips hosts a dinner for Ralph Waldo Emerson, Henry Wadsworth Longfellow, Oliver Wendell Holmes, Sr., James Russell Lowell and other literary notables at the Parker House Hotel, Boston, Massachusetts, to agree on launching The Atlantic Monthly, "a magazine of literature, art, and politics", on November 1 with Lowell as first editor.
June 25 – Charles Baudelaire's collection of poems Les Fleurs du mal is published in Paris. He will be convicted and some of the most decadent poems suppressed on charges of offending morals and religion.
August 21 – 24 – Performances of Wilkie Collins' drama The Frozen Deep at the Free Trade Hall, Manchester, for the benefit of the widow of writer Douglas William Jerrold (died June 8), during which Charles Dickens, who is directing and performing, becomes infatuated with the professional actress Ellen Ternan.
September – Obscene Publications Act 1857 is passed in the United Kingdom, making the sale of obscene material a statutory offence (although it gives no definition of obscenity). William Dugdale, a prime target of the act, is one of the first to be charged under it. The Act is replaced with a less stringent one in 1959.
September 25 – Eugène Sue's extended fiction Les Mystères du peuple is condemned on charges of offending morals and religion, the author having died on August 3.
October – The Sacramento Library Association, predecessor of Sacramento Public Library, is established as a public subscription library in Sacramento, California, by members of the "Big Four" and other prominent citizens.
November 1 – The Atlantic Monthly is first published, in Boston, Massachusetts, by Phillips, Sampson and Company.
unknown dates – George Eliot's Scenes of Clerical Life are published as a serial in Blackwood's Edinburgh Magazine through the year, as her first work of fiction and the first use of her pseudonym.

New books

Fiction
Hans Christian Andersen – To Be or Not to Be
Matilda Betham-Edwards – The White House by the Sea
George Borrow – The Romany Rye
Charlotte Brontë (posthumously, as Currer Bell) – The Professor
Juliet H. Lewis Campbell (as Judith Canute) – Eros and Antieros; or, The Bachelor's Ward
Wilkie Collins  – The Dead Secret
Charles De Coster – Légendes flamandes
Charles Dickens – Little Dorrit (complete in book form)
Alexandre Dumas, père – The Wolf Leader (Le Meneur de loups)
Vintsent Dunin-Martsinkyevich – Ciekawyś? Przeczytaj! Trzy powiastki i wierszyk ulotny (Interested? Read it! Three tales and brief verse)
Gustave Flaubert  – Madame Bovary
Théophile Gautier  – Jettatura (The Jinx)
Catherine Gore – The Two Aristocracies
George A. Lawrence (anonymously) – Guy Livingstone, or Thorough
Fitz Hugh Ludlow – The Hasheesh Eater
Herman Melville – The Confidence-Man
G. W. M. Reynolds – The Necromancer
X. B. Saintine – Seul (Alone)
Catharine Maria Sedgwick – Married or Single?
Adalbert Stifter – Der Nachsommer (Indian Summer)
William Makepeace Thackeray – The Virginians (begins serialisation)
Anthony Trollope – Barchester Towers

Children and young people
R. M. Ballantyne
The Coral Island
Ungava: a Tale of Eskimo Land
Clara de Chatelain – Little Folk's Books (initially in four volumes)
Thomas Hughes – Tom Brown's Schooldays
Annie Keary – The Heroes of Asgard (with Eliza Harriett Keary)

Drama
Wilkie Collins (with Charles Dickens) – The Frozen Deep
Ferdinand Dugué – William Shakespeare: drame en six actes
Liautaud Ethéart – Le Monde de Chez Nous
Charles Heavysege – Saul: a drama in three parts
Henrik Ibsen – The Vikings at Helgeland (Hærmændene paa Helgeland)
Andreas Munch – Lord William Russell
Ramnarayan Tarkaratna – Kulīn-Kul-Sarbasva (A. Kulīn's All in All)

Poetry
Charles Baudelaire – Les Fleurs du mal
William Morris - The Defence of Guenevere

Non-fiction
Louis Agassiz – Essay on Classification
Delia Bacon – The Philosophy of Shakespeare's Plays Unfolded
Elizabeth Gaskell – The Life of Charlotte Brontë
Philip Gosse – Omphalos: An Attempt to Untie the Geological Knot
Hinton Rowan Helper – The Impending Crisis of the South
Chandos Wren-Hoskyns – Agricultural Statistics
Washington Irving – The Life of George Washington, Volume 4
Allan Kardec – The Spirits' Book
David Livingstone – Missionary Travels and Researches in South Africa
John David Macbride – The Mohammedan Religion Explained. With an Introductory Sketch of its Progress, and Suggestions for its Confutation
Désiré van Monckhoven – Méthodes simplifiées de photographie sur papier (Simplified Methods of Photography on Paper)
William Smith (editor) – Dictionary of Greek and Roman Geography

Births
February 7 – Benjamin Eli Smith, American editor of reference books (died 1913)
February 9 – A. H. Bullen, English editor and publisher (died 1920)
February 23 – Margaret Deland, American novelist (died 1945)
February 27 – Agnes Mary Frances Duclaux, née Robinson, English-born poet, biographer and novelist (died 1944)
March 27 – Ella Hepworth Dixon, English writer, novelist and editor (died 1932)
May 21 – Frances Brackett Damon, American writer (died 1939)
May 28 – Annie Maria Barnes, American journalist, editor, and author (died, date unknown)
July – Adriana Porter, American Wiccan poet (died 1946)
July 24 – Henrik Pontoppidan, Danish Nobel Prize-winning author (died 1943)
September 30 – Hermann Sudermann, German dramatist and novelist (died 1928)
October 5 – Peadar Toner Mac Fhionnlaoich, Irish Gaelic writer (died 1942)
October 31 – Axel Munthe, Swedish physician and author (died 1949)
November 22 – George Gissing, English novelist and critic (died 1903)
November 26 – Ferdinand de Saussure, Swiss linguist (died 1913)
December 3 – Joseph Conrad (Józef Teodor Konrad Korzeniowski), Polish-born English novelist and story writer (died 1924)
December 4 – Julia Ditto Young, American poet and novelist (died 1915)

Deaths
January 5 – Albert Schwegler, German philosopher and theologian (born 1819)
February 3 – Robert Wilberforce, English historian and religious writer (born 1802)
March 11 – Manuel José Quintana, Spanish poet (born 1772)
March 26 – John Mitchell Kemble, English historian (born 1807)
April 19 – Elizabeth Wynne Fremantle, English diarist (born 1778)
May 2 – Alfred de Musset, French novelist and poet (heart failure, born 1810)
June 8 – Douglas William Jerrold, English dramatist (born 1803)
June 25 – Isabella Kelly, Scottish novelist and poet (born 1759)
July 29 – James Holman, English travel writer (born 1786)
August 3 – Eugène Sue, French novelist (born 1804)
August 10 – John Wilson Croker, Irish writer and statesman (born 1780)
September 5 – Auguste Comte, French philosopher (born 1798)
September 18 – Jean Baptiste Gustave Planche, French critic (born 1808)
November 26 – Joseph Freiherr von Eichendorff, German poet and novelist (born 1788)
December 13 – Richard Furness, English poet (born 1791)

Awards
Newdigate Prize – Philip Stanhope Worsley

In literature
May 10 – Indian Rebellion of 1857 breaks out; it features in:
J. G. Farrell's novel The Siege of Krishnapur (1973)
John Masters' novel Nightrunners of Bengal (1951)
Matthew Kneale's English Passengers (2000) is set during this year

References

 
Years of the 19th century in literature